Only a Mother (Swedish: Bara en mor) is a 1949 Swedish drama film directed by Alf Sjöberg and starring Eva Dahlbeck, Ragnar Falck and Ulf Palme. It featured the acting debut of Max Von Sydow.

The film's sets were designed by the art director Nils Svenwall.

Main cast 
Eva Dahlbeck as Maria, aka Rya-Rya
Ragnar Falck as Henrik, Rya-Rya's husband
Ulf Palme as Hammar
Hugo Björne as Eniel
Åke Fridell as Inspector
Mona Geijer-Falkner as Emili
Max von Sydow as Nils
Margaretha Krook as Berta
Mimi Pollak as Erika Rost
Elsa Widborg as Cowman's wife
Olof Widgren as Rya-Rya's Father
Ulla Smidje as Cecilia, the sick girl
Sif Ruud as Teacher
Signe Rydberg-Eklöf as Rya-Rya's Mother
Ernst Brunman as School council's chairman
Nils Hultgren as Alm, Cecilia's father

References

Bibliography 
 Gunnar Iverson, Astrid Soderbergh Widding & Tytti Soila. Nordic National Cinemas. Routledge, 2005.

External links 

1949 films
1949 drama films
1940s Swedish-language films
Swedish black-and-white films
Films directed by Alf Sjöberg
Swedish drama films
Films based on Swedish novels
Films scored by Dag Wirén
1940s Swedish films